Walther Adrian Schücking (6 January 1875, Münster, Westphalia – 25 August 1935) was a German liberal politician, professor of public international law and the first German judge at the Permanent Court of International Justice in The Hague.

He was a German delegate to the International union of Hague conference, and one of the six German delegates to the Paris Peace Conference to whom the Allies presented the draft Treaty of Versailles. As a member of the Weimar National Assembly and then the Reichstag from 1919 to 1928, he was the second chairman of the parliamentary inquiry into the question of guilt for the First World War.

Walther Schücking was nominated for the Nobel Peace Prize in 1918, 1919, 1920 and 1928, 1929, 1930, 1931, 1932, 1933, 1934.

In 1995, the Institute of International Law at the University of Kiel was renamed the Walther Schücking Institute of International Law in his honor.

Biography
Schücking was born in Münster, Westphalia on 6 January 1875 to the district judge Carl Lothar Levin Schücking and his wife Luise Wilhelmine Amalie Beitzke (daughter of the politician and historian Heinrich Beitzke). His grandfather was the German novelist Levin Schücking (1814–1883). His brothers were Levin Ludwig Schücking (1878–1964), professor of English at the University of Leipzig, and Lothar Engelbert Schücking (1873–1943), lawyer, author and mayor of Husum. Schücking was married to Irmgard Auguste Charlotte Marte von Laer (1881–1952).

External links

References

1875 births
1935 deaths
People from Münster
People from the Province of Westphalia
German Protestants
German Democratic Party politicians
Members of the Weimar National Assembly
Members of the Reichstag of the Weimar Republic
German Peace Society members
20th-century German judges